KLOK-FM (99.5 FM) is a radio station broadcasting a Regional Mexican format. Licensed to Greenfield, California, United States, the station serves the Santa Cruz area.  The station is currently owned by Entravision Communications.

History
The station went on the air as KSUR-FM on New Year's Day 1994. On July 15, 1994, the station changed its call sign to KKHI-FM; on September 30 that same year, the call changed back to KSUR-FM; then once more on January 17, 1995, to the current KLOK-FM.

References

External links

LOK-FM
Radio stations established in 1994
LOK-FM
Entravision Communications stations
1994 establishments in California